Blood, Women, Roses is the debut studio album of Skin, released in 1987 by Product Inc.

Track listing

Personnel
Adapted from the Blood, Women, Roses liner notes.

Musicians
 Gini Ball – violin
 Michael Gira – drum programming, effects, musical arrangement, production
 Jarboe – lead vocals, keyboards, piano, effects, musical arrangement
 Martin McCarrick – cello
 Billy McGee – double bass, musical arrangement (A1)
 Chris Pitzaladi – viola
 Chris Tombling – violin
 Additional musicians
 William Barnhardt – piano (B2)
 Linda Miller – cello (A1)

Production and additional personnel
 Roop Caulson – engineering
 Ian Cooper – mastering
 Monica Curtin – photography
 John Fryer – engineering
 Paul Kendall – engineering
 Dave Powell – engineering
 Skin – design
 Paul White – design

Release history

References

External links 
 

1987 debut albums
Albums produced by Michael Gira